Genital pain and pelvic pain can arise from a variety of conditions, crimes, trauma, medical treatments, physical diseases, mental illness and infections. In some instances the pain is consensual and self-induced. Self-induced pain can be a cause for concern and may require a psychiatric evaluation. In other instances the infliction of pain is consensual but caused by another person (such as in surgery or tattooing). In other instances, the pain is vague" and difficult to localize. Abdominal pain can be related to conditions related to reproductive and urinary tissues and organs.

Those with pain in the genital and pelvic regions can have dysfunctional voiding or defecation. Pain in this region of the body can be associated with anxiety, depression and other psycho-social factors. In addition, this pain can have effects on activities of daily living or quality of life. Treatment can be symptomatic if the pathology is unknown and managed by physical therapy, counseling and medication.

Common to women and men

 anal fissure
 bladder mucosal inflammation
 bladder pain syndrome
 body modification
 constipation
 cystitis
 dyspareunia
 defecation
 epidermal cyst
 epiploic appendagitis
 genital modification and mutilation
 genital piercing
 genital warts
 hematoma
 hematometra
 hematosalpinx
 hematuria
 herpes genitalis
 increased anal resting pressures
 infibulation
 interstitial cystitis/bladder pain syndrome
 kidney stone
 levator ani syndrome
 Molluscum contagiosum
 pelvic congestion syndrome
 pelvic floor muscle spasm
 persistent genital arousal disorder
 polyuria
 proctalgia fugax
 pubic piercing
 rape
 rectal prolapse
 sexual assault
 sebaceous cyst
 sex toys
 sexual intercourse
 rough foreplay
 strangury
 urinary frequency
 urinary incontinence
 urinary retention
 shaving pubic hair
 wound dehiscence

Females

 adhesions
 adenomyosis
 Bartholin's cyst
 biopsy
 cervical motion tenderness
 Primary dysmenorrhoea
 contact dermatitis
 ectopic pregnancy
 endometrial biopsy
 endometrial polyp
 endometriosis
 endometriosis of ovary
 folliculitis
 female genital prolapse
 follicular cyst of ovary
 labor
 Lichen simplex chronicus
 Lichen sclerosus
 Lichen planus
 miscarriage
 imperforate hymen
 intraepithelial neoplasia
 labial trauma
 Mittelschmerz
 ovarian apoplexy
 ovarian cyst
 ovarian torsion
 pelvic congestion syndrome
 pelvic inflammatory disease
 Abscess of broad ligament
 Abscess of parametrium
 pelvic cellulitis
 pregnancy
 Sjögren syndrome
 urinary tract infection
 uterine prolapse
 vaginal dryness
 vaginismus
 vesico-uterine pouch
 vulvodynia
 vulva tumor
 vaginal bleeding
 vaginoplasty
 vulvar vestibulitis
 vulvar skin cracks and bleeds
 vulvectomy

Males

 benign prostatic hyperplasia
 chronic prostatitis/chronic pelvic pain syndrome
 deep shaft piercing
 dysuria
 epididymitis
 epididymal hypertension
 spermatocele
 intracavernous injection
 hydrocele
 subcutaneous emphysema
 impaling
 hematocele
 radiation proctitis
 inguinal hernia
 epididymo-orchitis
 Fournier's gangrene
 air embolism
 post-vasectomy pain syndrome
 testicular torsion
 scrotal cellulitis
 Paget's disease of the scrotum
 impotence
 penis constriction
 retrograde ejaculation
 self-injection of saline solution
 urethral sounding
 urolithiasis
 tamakeri
 testicular cancer
 varicocele
 Injecting air or another gas into the penis
 penile strangulation
 penile incarceration

Children
 child abuse
 dermatitis
 imperforate hymen
 pinworms

Treatments
 Analgesic
 Cordotomy
 Medical lubricant
 Personal lubricant

References

Symptoms
Symptoms
Pain
Chronic pain syndromes
Gynaecologic disorders
Child abuse
Rape